Jan Sandström (born 25 January 1954) is a Swedish classical music composer. His compositions include the so-called Motorbike Concerto for trombone and orchestra and his choral setting of Es ist ein Ros entsprungen.

Career
Born in Vilhelmina, Västerbotten County, Sandström grew up in Stockholm. He studied at the Luleå University of Technology's Piteå School of Music (1974–1976) and completed his music training at the Royal College of Music, Stockholm, studying music theory (1978–1982) and composition with Gunnar Bucht, Brian Ferneyhough and Pär Lindgren (1980–1984).

He joined the faculty of the Piteå School of Music in the 1980s and was appointed professor of composition in 1989.

In 1988 to 1989 he composed his first concerto for trombone and large orchestra, which became famous as the Motorbike Concerto, revised in 2002 to a Motorbike Odyssey. In 1990 he composed Es ist ein Ros entsprungen (Det är en ros utsprungen), placing the familiar Praetorius setting in slow motion in an eight-part a cappella setting.

In 1991 he completed Från Mörker till Ljus (From Darkness to Light) for reader, baritone and chamber orchestra, based on poems by Folke Isaksson, were inspired by an altarpiece from Antwerp in Gammelstad, with a focus on the Passion. The poems are partly spoken, partly sung, some accompanied by the orchestra; the tenth of 14 movements, Klarheten (Clarity), is purely orchestral. The work was recorded in 2002 with the singer of the premiere, Peter Mattei, speaker Sven Wollter and the Norrbotten Chamber Orchestra, conducted by Petter Sundkvist.

In 2008 his Rekviem (Requiem) on a Swedish text by Christine Falkenland was first performed at Stockholm's Hedvig Eleonora Church. A review summarised: "99% Pärt, 1% Bach".

In 2009 his ballet The Tale of a Manor was recorded on DVD by the Royal Swedish Ballet and the Swedish Radio Symphony Orchestra, conducted by Jonas Dominique.

In October 2013, a new choral work entitled Do what is fair was first performed in Uppsala Cathedral, as part of the Young Cathedral Voices festival. This new setting by Sandström of a text from Deuteronomy, for four choirs and four organs, was performed by choirs from Uppsala, Trondheim, Warsaw, Cologne, Llandaff, Riga and Solothurn.

Selected works

Orchestra

Concertos 
 A dance in the subdominant quagmire for soprano recorder and string orchestra, 1994
 Flute Concerto, 2008
 Clarinet Concerto, 2001
 My assam dragon, alto saxophone concerto, 1994 (for John-Edward Kelly)
 Trumpet Concerto No. 1, 1987 (for Håkan Hardenberger)
 Trumpet Concerto No. 2, 1993/96 (for Håkan Hardenberger)
 Trumpet Concerto No. 3, 2007 (for Ole Edvard Antonsen)
 Trombone Concerto No. 1, Motorcykelkonserten, 1988–89 (for Christian Lindberg)
 shortened version: A short ride on a motorbike, 1989
 revised version: A motorbike odyssey, 2002
 Trombone Concerto No. 2, Don Quixote, 1994 (for Christian Lindberg)
 Ecos de eternidad, concerto for two trombones, 2009
 The Lemon House, Tuba Concerto, 2004
 Piano Concerto No. 1, 1995
 Bona Spey, Piano Concerto No. 2, 2001

Orchestra 
 Era, 1979–80
 Snowflakes for chamber orchestra, 1980/84
 Acintyas for string orchestra, 1986
 Indri, 1988/89
 Kejsarvisan, 1993
 Ocean child, 1999/2004

Vocal

Opera 
 Bombi Bitt, 1991–92
 Macbeth², 1996
 K. Beskrivning av en kamp (K. description of a fight), 2005
 God Natt Madame!, 2006

Choral 
 Det är en ros utsprungen (Praetorius/Sandström) for two mixed choirs a cappella, 1990
 Sanctus for male or female choir, 1990, version for mixed choir 1993
 Te Deum (1996) for choir and orchestra
 Biegga luothe for mixed choir, 1998
 Across the bridge of hope for soloist and for mixed choir, 1999
 Ett svenskt requiem for choir, soloists and small orchestra, 2007, text by Christine Falkenland
 The word became flesh, 2010
 Do what is fair for two mixed choirs, two treble choirs and four organs, 2012

Chamber music 
 Wahlbergvariationer for cello and wind quintet, 1990
 version for saxophone quartet, 1993
 Sång till Lotta for trombone and piano, 1990

References

External links 
 
 Jan Sandström publisher's website
 
 Jan Sandstrum Naxos

20th-century classical composers
21st-century classical composers
Luleå University of Technology alumni
Royal College of Music, Stockholm alumni
Swedish classical composers
Swedish male classical composers
Swedish musical theatre composers
Academic staff of the Luleå University of Technology
Composers for piano
Litteris et Artibus recipients
Best Original Score Guldbagge Award winners
1954 births
Living people
People from Vilhelmina Municipality
Members of the Royal Swedish Academy of Music
Male film score composers
20th-century Swedish male musicians
20th-century Swedish musicians
21st-century Swedish male musicians